Pelican Lake is one of a trio of lakes that form a small endorheic basin in Cochrane District, Ontario, Canada.

The primary inflow is a small creek that starts at Ptarmigan Lake, then flows through Swallow Lake before reaching Pelican Lake, which has no outlet.

See also
List of lakes in Ontario

References

Lakes of Cochrane District